Peter McKeich Jamieson (born 1 July 1946) is a Scottish chess player, FIDE Master and twice a Scottish Chess Championship winner (1965, 1973).

Biography
Jamieson was born in Glasgow in 1946, and in 1963 he won the British Boys' Chess Championships (U18). He was a participant in the Glorney Cup in 1962, 1963, and 1964. In 1965, Jamieson represented Scotland at the World Junior Chess Championship.  Jamieson won the Scottish Championship twice: 1965 (shared with James Macrae Aitken) and 1973.

Jamieson played for Scotland in the Chess Olympiads:
 In 1970, at first reserve board in the 19th Chess Olympiad in Siegen (+3, =2, −5),
 In 1972, at fourth board in the 20th Chess Olympiad in Skopje (+7, =6, −3),
 In 1974, at fourth board in the 21st Chess Olympiad in Nice (+8, =4, −5),
 In 1976, at third board in the 22nd Chess Olympiad in Haifa (+4, =2, −2),
 In 1978, at third board in the 23rd Chess Olympiad in Buenos Aires (+4, =5, −3).

Jamieson played for Scotland in the World Student Team Chess Championships:
 In 1966, at first board in the 13th World Student Team Chess Championship in Örebro (+3, =0, −6),
 In 1967, at first board in the 14th World Student Team Chess Championship in Harrachov (+3, =1, −6).

Jamieson was awarded the FIDE Master title in 1989.

References

External links

1946 births
Living people
Sportspeople from Glasgow
Scottish chess players
Chess Olympiad competitors
Chess FIDE Masters